Bartholomeus Gabriel le Roux (born 28 January 1994) is a South African rugby union player, who most recently played for the  in the Currie Cup. He usually plays as a tighthead prop.

Rugby career

Schools rugby

In 2011, he was a member of a South Africa Schools Academy that lost to a France B team in Durban.

Sharks

After school, he joined the Sharks Academy, representing the side at Under-19 and Under-21 level. He also played for university side  in the 2014 Varsity Shield competition.

Leopards

He then made eight starts for the Leopards in the 2016 Currie Cup qualification series, but could not help the team to secure a spot in the Premier Division, instead qualifying to the First Division.

Zebre

Le Roux moved to Italy to join Pro12 side Zebre before the 2016–17 season. Le Roux played 6 games, starting 2 and coming on as substitute for 4 for Zebre, playing 222 minutes in the Pro12

References

South African rugby union players
Living people
1994 births
Rugby union players from Pretoria
Rugby union props
Leopards (rugby union) players